The Turkey Men's National Wheelchair Basketball Team is the wheelchair basketball side that represents Turkey in international competitions for men. The team is nicknamed "12 Cesur Yürek" (literally "12 Brave Hearts").

History
The national team won a bronze medal (2014) at the Wheelchair Basketball World Championship and became three times runner-up (2009, 2013, 2015) and once champion (2017) at the European Wheelchair Basketball Championship.

Current roster
Team roster at the Wheelchair basketball at the 2016 Summer Paralympics:

Competitions

European Championship

World Championship

Paralympics

Past Rosters
2017 European Championship: finished champion among 12 teams
#1 Deniz Acar, #3 Kaan Dalay, #5 Özgür Gürbulak, #9 Uğur Toprak, #10 Cem Gezinci, #11 Fikri Gündoğdu, #15 Selim Sayak, #35 Ferit Gümüş, #55 Murat Aeslanoğlu, #61 Metin Bahçekapılı, #77 İsmail Ar, #99 |İbrahim Yavuz , Coach:  Tacettin Çıpa.

Turkey men's junior national wheelchair basketball team

Current roster
This is the roster for the 2017 IWBF Men's U22 Wheelchair Basketball European Championship:

Head Coach:  Mahmut Kemal Okur
Assistant Coach:  Caner Cesur
Physiotherapist:  Ali Imran Yalçın
Mechanic:  Haluk Taşınçay
Companion:  Gülcan Girgin

IWBF U23 World Wheelchair Basketball Championship

See also
 Turkey women's national wheelchair basketball team

References

National men's wheelchair basketball teams
Wheelchair basketball
National mens